<noinclude>
The United States foreign policy toward the People's Republic of China originated during the Cold War. At that time, the U.S. had a containment policy against communist states. The leaked Pentagon Papers indicated the efforts by the U.S. to contain China through military actions undertaken in the Vietnam War. The containment policy at East Asian island arcs is called "the First and Second island chains". President Richard Nixon's China rapprochement signaled a shift in focus to gain leverage in containing the Soviet Union. Formal diplomatic ties between the U.S. and China were established in 1979, and with normalized trade relations since 2000, the U.S. and China have been linked by closer economic ties and more cordial relations.

During the 2010s and early 2020s, there was a significant shift in America's China policy. In his first term as U.S. president, Barack Obama said, "We want China to succeed and prosper. It's good for the United States if China continues on the path of development that it's on." The Trump administration stated, "The United States recognizes the long-term strategic competition between our two systems." The Biden administration stated that previous optimistic approaches to China were flawed, and that China poses "the most significant challenge of any nation-state in the world to the United States". However, the US National Security Advisor, Jake Sullivan, has stated that the Biden administration does not pursue a fundamental transformation of the Chinese political system.

U.S. military presence in the region, efforts to improve relations with India and Vietnam, and the Obama administration's 2012 "Pivot to Asia" strategy for increased American involvement in the Western Pacific, have been associated with a policy aimed at countering China's growing clout. The Trump administration designated China as a "revisionist power" seeking to overturn the liberal international order and displace the United States, and called for a whole-of-government approach to China guided by a return to principled realism. Current U.S. military presence in the region includes military alliances with South Korea, with Japan, and with the Philippines. China remains “the only competitor out there with both the intent to reshape the international order and, increasingly, a power to do so” according to the US released National Defense Strategy in 2022. And China’s Xi jinping claimed “Western countries led by the United States have contained and suppressed us in an all-round way, which has brought unprecedented severe challenges to our development” in 2023.

Strategic background

Cold War era
During the Cold War the United States tried to prevent the domino theory of the spread of communism and thwart communist countries including the People's Republic of China. Washington assumed that Communist North Vietnam would be a puppet state of China. However those two later went to war.

Post-Cold War
In more contemporary times, with the Nixon rapprochement and the signing of the Shanghai Communiqué, improvement in U.S.-Sino relations was made possible. Formal diplomatic ties were established in 1979, and with normalized trade relations since 2000, the US and China have been linked by closer economic ties.

The United States' 2006 Quadrennial Defense Review stated that China has "the greatest potential to compete militarily with the United States and field disruptive military technologies that could over time offset traditional U.S. military advantages absent U.S. counter strategies". The 2006 National Security Strategy stated that the U.S. wanted China to continue down the road of reform and openness. It said that as economic growth continues, China would face a growing demand from its own people to follow the path of East Asia's many modern democracies, adding political freedom to economic freedom. The document continues by stating that China cannot stay on this peaceful path while holding on to "old ways of thinking and acting" that exacerbate regional and international security concerns. The U.S. referred to the "old ways" in terms of non-transparent military expansion, mercantilism, and supporting resource-rich regimes with a record of unacceptable behavior.

The United States' political leadership began to shift policy stances in 2011, starting with the Obama administration's "pivot" toward Asia. Then-secretary of state Hillary Clinton called for "increased investment—diplomatic, economic, strategic, and otherwise—in the Asia-Pacific region", which was seen as a move to counter China's growing clout. Supporters of increased American involvement in East Asia have cited the United States as a counterbalance to the excesses of Chinese expansion. Relevant to the argument is the fact that countries in territorial disputes with China, such as in the South China Sea and the Senkaku Islands, have complained about China's harassment in the disputed areas. Some experts have suggested that China may leverage their economic strength in such disputes, one example being the sudden restriction on Chinese imports of Filipino bananas during tensions over the Scarborough Shoal.

Recent development

In April 2019, the fourth iteration of the influential neoconservative think tank, the Committee on the Present Danger, was unveiled, calling itself the "Committee on the Present Danger: China (CPDC)" in a press conference in Washington. The organization was reformed by former Trump administration White House Chief Strategist Steve Bannon and former Reagan administration official Frank Gaffney to "educate and inform American citizens and policymakers about the existential threats presented from the Peoples Republic of China under the misrule of the Chinese Communist Party". The CPDC takes the view that there is "no hope of coexistence with China as long as the Communist Party governs the country". Charles W. Freeman Jr. at the Watson Institute called the CPDC "a Who's Who of contemporary wing-nuts, very few of whom have any expertise at all about China and most of whom represent ideological causes only peripherally connected to it."

In a May 2019 opinion piece published by Foreign Policy, Paul Musgrave, an assistant professor at the University of Massachusetts Amherst commented that the Trump administration revealed details about a long-term strategy in dealing with the rise of China via a "slip" by then-director of policy planning Kiron Skinner at the US State Department. In a speech at the Future Security Forum on April 29, 2019, Skinner characterized the Cold War as "a huge fight within the Western family" and due to that shared heritage and value-system, breakthroughs could be made; on China however, she argued there can be no accommodation or cooperation because it is "... a fight with a really different civilization and a different ideology" and "it's the first time that we will have a great-power competitor that is not Caucasian".

A study on China produced by a small working group within the department led by Skinner reportedly envisioned a world of constant, unavoidable civilizational conflict. The study was informally called "Letter X" in reference to George F. Kennan's X Article that advocated for a containment strategy against the Soviet Union. In August 2019, The New York Times reported that Skinner had been forced out of her job at the United States Department of State, and that Trump administration officials privately dismissed her comments. Earlier in the year, an open letter titled "China is not an enemy" was released by five China-focused scholars and foreign policy experts, and was endorsed by some business leaders, in which they decried what they saw in the U.S. approach as "counterproductive", and urged the Trump administration to continue the more "cooperative" approach.

With questions about the continued purpose of the North Atlantic Treaty Organization (NATO) in the post–Cold War era, NATO countries have refrained from re-orienting toward and labeling the PRC an outright "enemy", but NATO chief Jens Stoltenberg said the organization needs to recognize the "challenges" posed by China at a NATO event in 2019, saying "China will soon have the world's biggest economy. And it already has the second largest defense budget, investing heavily in new capabilities." He also said that NATO did not want to "create new adversaries". The United States' NATO representative at the event referred to China as a "competitor".

On May 20, 2020, in accordance with the John S. McCain National Defense Authorization Act for Fiscal Year 2019, the Trump administration delivered a report, "U.S. Strategic Approach to the People's Republic of China" to members of the U.S. Congress. The report states a whole-of-government approach to China under the 2017 National Security Strategy, which says it is time the U.S. "rethink the failed policies of the past two decades – policies based on the assumption that engagement with rivals and their inclusion in international institutions and global commerce would turn them into benign actors and trustworthy partners". The report says it "reflects a fundamental reevaluation of how the United States understands and responds to" the leaders of China, adding "The United States recognizes the long-term strategic competition between our two systems."

In February 2021, U.S. president Joe Biden said that China is the "most serious competitor" that poses challenges on the "prosperity, security, and democratic values" of the U.S. U.S. secretary of state Antony Blinken stated that previous optimistic approaches to China were flawed, and that China poses "the most significant challenge of any nation-state in the world to the United States". Blinken also agreed that Biden's predecessor, Donald Trump, "was right in taking a tougher approach to China".

In April 2021, the U.S. Senate introduced major legislation in response to China's growing clout in international affairs. The bill, titled "Strategic Competition Act of 2021", reflects hardline attitude of both congressional Democrats and Republicans, and sets out to counter the Chinese government's diplomatic and strategic initiatives. Senate Foreign Relations Committee Chairman Bob Menendez (D-NJ) said, "The Strategic Competition Act of 2021 is a recognition that this moment demands a unified, strategic response that can rebuild American leadership, invest in our ability to out-compete China, and reground diplomacy in our core values", adding "The United States government must be clear-eyed and sober about Beijing's intentions and actions, and calibrate our policy and strategy accordingly."

In May 2021, the Strategic Competition Act of 2021 was consolidated into a larger bill, the United States Innovation and Competition Act (USICA), authorizing  for basic and advanced technology research over a five-year period. In June 2021, the USICA passed 68–32 in the Senate with bipartisan support.

Military strategy

The United States' Indo-Pacific strategy has broadly been to use the surrounding countries around China to blunt its influence. This includes strengthening the bonds between South Korea and Japan as well as trying to get India, another large developing country to help with their efforts. Additionally, with the US withdrawal from the Intermediate-Range Nuclear Forces Treaty with Russia (in part because China wasn't a party to it), the US has reportedly wanted to find a host in the Asia-Pacific region to point the previously banned weapons at China. In addition to soft power diplomacy within the region, the US is physically surrounding China with military bases in the event of any conflict. The United States has developed many military bases in the Asia Pacific equipped with warships, nuclear missiles and nuclear-capable strategic bombers as a deterrent and to achieve full spectrum dominance in a strategy similar to that of the Cold War.

Sanctions

The use of economic sanctions has always been a tool of American foreign policy and has become used more frequently in the 21st century, from targeting individuals and sometimes whole countries by using the centrality of the US financial system and the position of the US dollar as the world's reserve currency to limit trade and cashflow.

Xinjiang

In the area of human rights and international law, the U.S. has worked to put pressure on China internationally by drawing attention to its human rights record. In particular, U.S. policymakers have focused on the status of China's "re-education camps" for those accused of religious extremism in China's Xinjiang Autonomous Region, the region inhabited by the Muslim Uyghur minority, as well as the protests in Hong Kong. These camps, which some NGOs such as the Washington-based Victims of Communism Memorial Foundation and East Turkistan National Awakening Movement estimated to have a population of over one million people, have been described as "indoctrination camps" that are reportedly run like prisons to eradicate Uyghur culture and religion in an attempt at Sinicization. The United States Congress has responded to these reports with calls for the imposition of sanctions under the Global Magnitsky Human Rights Accountability Act; in December 2019, the House of Representatives and Senate passed the Uighur Human Rights Policy Act.

Hong Kong

As has been the case in the past with other adversarial countries, some pro-Chinese commentators argue that the US has allegedly taken advantage of cleavages and regionalism within the PRC and the One Country Two Systems framework to divide and conquer, particularly in Xinjiang, Tibet and Hong Kong, through the promotion of western democratic institutions. They criticized "US meddling in domestic affairs" when a controversial extradition bill was introduced in the Hong Kong Special Administrative Region, sparking the 2019–2020 Hong Kong protests. Beijing accused the US of domestic interference by allegedly backing a particularly violent contingent of protesters wearing black masks through the US government-funded National Endowment for Democracy. Although the US denies the allegations of interference, pro-Chinese elements nevertheless maintained such view, stating that US diplomats have been photographed meeting with the protesters and lawmakers have hosted multiple protest leaders in Washington and voiced public support for the protesters' demands, and saying that the "One-Country, Two-Systems" arrangement should be honored.

Economic strategy
With China entering the World Trade Organization in 2001 with approval from the US, China and the world economy benefited from globalization and the access to new markets and the increased trade that resulted. Despite this, some in the United States lament letting China in the WTO because part of the motivation to do so, the political liberalization of the PRC's government along the lines of the Washington Consensus never materialized. The US hoped economic liberalization would eventually lead to political liberalization to a government more akin to the then recently repatriated Hong Kong Special Administrative Region under One country, two systems.

Trans-Pacific Partnership

In part, the Trans-Pacific Partnership (TPP), geopolitically was thought by some to likely bring China's neighbours closer to the United States and reduce its economic leverage and dependence on Chinese trade. If ratified, the TPP would have strengthened American influence on future rules for the global economy. US Secretary of Defense Ash Carter claimed the passage of the TPP to be as valuable to the United States as the creation of another aircraft carrier. President Barack Obama has argued "if we don't pass this agreement—if America doesn't write those rules—then countries like China will".

On January 23, 2017, the newly elected President Donald Trump formally withdrew the United States from the Trans-Pacific Partnership.

Trade War

In what would become the China–United States trade war, President Donald Trump began setting tariffs and other trade barriers on China in 2018 with the goal of forcing it to make changes to what the U.S. says are "unfair trade practices". The US says those trade practices and their effects are the growing trade deficit, the theft of intellectual property and the forced transfer of American technology to China. Jeff Spross, an economics and business correspondent at TheWeek.com, commented that China is pursuing economic development much in the same way as many other modern industrialized economies before it, except in a world where the rules of the global free trade order are enforced by institutions like the World Bank, the International Monetary Fund, and the World Trade Organization, ensuring economic development is driven by private investors.

At the Bretton Woods Conference, the US representative, Harry Dexter White, insisted that the world reserve currency be the United States dollar instead of a proposed new international unit of currency and that the IMF and World Bank be under the purview of the United States. The Reagan administration and US Trade Representative Robert Lighthizer, and Donald Trump as a private citizen, made identical claims in the 1980s when Japan was undergoing its economic miracle which led Japan to signing the Plaza Accord. Like the TPP, it has been argued that the trade war is simply a more direct attempt to stifle China's development and is indicative of a shift in the US public perception of China as a "rival nation to be contained and beaten" among the two major political parties in Congress, the general public and even the business sector. It has been argued however that employing the Cold War playbook for the seemingly destined-to-fail Soviet Union, a state-run and largely closed economy will not work in the case of China because of its sheer size, growing wealth and vibrant economy. To halt development progress, particularly the Made in China 2025 plan, the US has responded by making it harder for Chinese tech companies from obtaining US technologies by investing in or acquiring US tech companies, and even attempting to stifle specific companies, namely Huawei, ZTE and ByteDance, from doing business domestically and abroad allegedly due to unspecified or speculative national security risks. With senior Trump administration officials such as John Bolton, Peter Navarro and Robert Lighthizer demanding any comprehensive trade deal feature "structural changes" which would essentially entail China surrendering its sovereignty over its economic system and planning (its Made in China 2025 industrial plan) and permanently ceding technology leadership to the US-an untenable situation to the Chinese- some see trade tensions continuing long into the future.

In the face of the US tariffs in the trade war and the sanctions on Russia following the annexation of Crimea, China and Russia have cultivated closer economic ties as well as security and defense cooperation to offset the losses.

Belt and Road Initiative

Another high-profile debate among some people in the United States and China on the international stage is the observation about China's growing geopolitical footprint in "soft power diplomacy" and international development finance. Particularly, this surrounds China's Belt and Road Initiative (formerly "One Belt, One Road"), which has been labeled as "aggressive" and "debt trap diplomacy", with the latter referring to the sale of an interest in a 99-year lease by Sri Lanka in the Port of Hambantota to a Chinese state-owned company after Sri Lanka had trouble on a loan to develop the port.

Some commentators say that China is utilizing and selling the expertise it has gained in poverty alleviation and infrastructure building used in its own modernization experience to other developing countries. A study conducted by the Rhodium Group found only one case of asset seizure, the oft-cited Hambantota Port in Sri Lanka, saying that China is more likely to restructure or write-off the debt.

Strategic alliances

US–Japan–Australia

Then-U.S. secretary of state Condoleezza Rice visited Australia in March 2006 for the "trilateral security forum" with the Japanese foreign minister Taro Aso and his Australian counterpart Alexander Downer.

US–Japan–Australia–India (the "Quad")

In May 2007, the four nations signed a strategic military partnership agreement, the Quadrilateral Security Dialogue.

US–Japan–India

The three nations held their first trilateral meeting in December 2011.

US–Taiwan (ROC)

Although the United States recognized the People's Republic of China in 1979, the US maintains de facto diplomatic relations and is bound to it by the Taiwan Relations Act, which ambiguously states, "the United States will make available to Taiwan such defense articles and defense services in such quantity as may be necessary to enable Taiwan to maintain a sufficient self-defense capabilities".

Previously, the United States recognized the Republic of China as the sole legitimate government of China despite the loss of the territory during the Chinese Civil War. In 1954, the US and the ROC on Taiwan (Formosa) signed the Sino-American Mutual Defense Treaty, which essentially prevented the People's Liberation Army from taking over the island of Taiwan. During the Cold War, the treaty prolonged and assisted the Republic of China in maintaining legitimacy as the sole government of the whole of mainland China until the early 1970s and also helped US policymakers to shape the policy of containment in East Asia together with South Korea and Japan against the spread of communism. In 1980, the treaty was abrogated after the US normalized relations with the PRC.

The recent decade has seen an increasing frequency of US arms sales to Taiwan alongside expanding commercial ties. On December 16, 2015, the Obama administration announced a deal to sell $1.83 billion worth of arms to the Armed Forces of Taiwan, a year and eight months after U.S. Congress passed the Taiwan Relations Act Affirmation and Naval Vessel Transfer Act of 2014 to allow the sale of Oliver Hazard Perry-class frigates to Taiwan. The deal would include the sale of two decommissioned U.S. Navy frigates, anti-tank missiles, Assault Amphibious Vehicles, and FIM-92 Stinger surface-to-air missiles, amid the territorial disputes in the South China Sea.

A new $250 million compound for the American Institute in Taiwan was unveiled in June 2018, accompanied by a "low-key" American delegation. The Chinese authorities denounced this action as violation of the "one China" policy statement and demanded the US to stop all relations with Taiwan without intercession of China. In 2019, the US approved the sale of 108 M1A2 Abrams tanks and 250 Stinger missiles for $2.2 billion and 66 F-16V fighter jets for $8 billion. With the sale, China vowed to sanction any companies involved in the transactions. In May 2020, the U.S. Department of State approved a possible Foreign Military Sales of 18 MK-48 Mod 6 Advanced Technology heavy weight torpedoes for Taiwan in a deal estimated to cost $180 million.

US–Philippines

The relationship between the United States and the Philippines has historically been strong and has been described as a Special Relationship. The 1951 mutual-defense treaty was reaffirmed with the November 2011 Manila Declaration.

US–South Korea

The US continues to host military bases in South Korea. The Chinese believe the deployment of the US made Terminal High Altitude Area Defense (THAAD) missile system on the peninsula is not for the stated purpose of protecting against a nuclear armed North Korea, but to degrade the PLA Rocket Force from carrying out a second strike in the event of a nuclear war with the United States. South Korea's decision to deploy the system led to a significant deterioration in China–South Korea relations.

Challenges

Australia

Australia has a growing dependency on China's market. Its mining industry is booming owing to Chinese demand. During the second Bush administration, ahead of the visit by Secretary of State Condoleezza Rice and her warning about China becoming a "negative force" the Australian Foreign Affairs Minister, Alexander Downer, warned that Australia does not agree with a policy of containment of China. Rice clarified that the U.S. is not advocating a containment policy. Despite some domestic opposition, Australia rejoined the Quadrilateral Security Dialogue and became a member of AUKUS.

India

India is a founding member of the Non Aligned Movement, a group of mostly developing states that are not formally aligned with or against any major power bloc which has among its five pillars "mutual non-aggression", "mutual non-interference in domestic affairs", and "peaceful co-existence". The basis of the Non Aligned Movement is based on the principles in a 1954 agreement on China–India relations, the Five Principles of Peaceful Coexistence.

China is India's second largest trading partner after the United States. Since George W. Bush's visit to India and offering India important nuclear technology, bilateral trade relations have become closer. China was the US's fifth-largest trading partner in terms of exports, but India ranks only twenty-fourth in the 2010s. Dealing with Russia has emerged as a major disagreement between the US and India. Policymakers in New Delhi may see maintaining ties with Moscow as a way to influence Russia's relationship with China and thwart any coordinated action the two might take against India.

Japan

Japan is closely linked to American strategy but China has overtaken the US as Japan's largest trading partner.

Philippines 

Under President Rodrigo Duterte, the Philippines has cultivated closer ties to China and has tried to compartmentalize the South China Sea territorial issues from the broader relationship. In a speech in July 2019, President Duterte claimed that the United States has been trying to use the Philippines as "bait" to ignite regional conflict and confrontation with China regarding incidents in the South China Sea, "egging" him to take military action against China and pledging US support through the mutual defense obligations. To this idea he sarcastically said, "if America wants China to leave, and I can't make them... I want the whole 7th Fleet of the armed forces of the United States of America there... when they enter the South China Sea, I will enter." He added, "what do you think Filipinos are, earthworms?... now, I say, you bring your planes, your boats to South China Sea. Fire the first shot, and we are just here behind you. Go ahead, let's fight."

See also
 American geostrategy related
 America's Pivot to Asia Strategy
 AirSea Battle
 Blue Team (U.S. politics)
 Geostrategy in Central Asia
 Island chain strategy
 Second Cold War

 Chinese geostrategy related
 Belt and Road Initiative
 Chinese century
 China's peaceful rise
 List of disputed territories of China
 String of Pearls (Indian Ocean)

 Bilateral and multilateral relations
 Quadrilateral Security Dialogue
 Post–Cold War era
 Malabar (naval exercise)
 Australia–United States relations
 China–United States relations
 India–United States relations
 Japan–United States relations
 Philippines–United States relations

References

Further reading

 Buzan, Barry and Evelyn Goh, eds. Rethinking Sino-Japanese Alienation: History Problems and Historical Opportunities (2020)
 Goh, Evelyn, and Rosemary Foot.  From containment to containment? Understanding US relations with China since 1949 (Blackwell, 2003).
 Goh, Evelyn, and Sheldon W. Simon, eds. China, the United States, and South-East Asia: Contending Perspectives on Politics, Security, and Economics (2007)
 Green, Michael J. By more than providence: Grand strategy and American power in the Asia Pacific since 1783 (Columbia UP, 2017).
 Sahashi, Ryo. "Japan’s strategy amid US–China confrontation." China International Strategy Review 2.2 (2020): 232–245.

China–United States relations
United States foreign policy